Quezaltepeque is a municipality in the La Libertad department of El Salvador.

It is located about 15 km from San Salvador.

The word Quezaltepeque is a Nahuat word meaning "hills of quetzal." A quetzal is a bird that used to live around the area of Quezaltepeque. High levels of deforestation forced the bird to migrate to other areas.

People
Alfonso Quijada Urías (born 1940) Poet
Salvador Sánchez Cerén (born 1944) 42nd President of Salvador 2014-2019
 Darwin Ceren, Salvadoran footballer who plays for Houston Dynamo who also captains the El Salvador National football team.

Sports
The local football club is named Juventud Alegre F.C. and it currently plays in the Salvadoran Third Division.

References

Municipalities of the La Libertad Department (El Salvador)